Rangpur-2 is a constituency represented in the Jatiya Sangsad (National Parliament) of Bangladesh since 2014 by Abul Kalam Md. Ahasanul Hoque Chowdhury of the Awami League.

Boundaries 
The constituency encompasses Badarganj and Taraganj upazilas.

History 
The constituency was created for the first general elections in newly independent Bangladesh, held in 1973.

Members of Parliament

Elections

Elections in the 2010s 
Abul Kalam Md. Ahasanul Hoque Chowdhury was elected unopposed in the 2014 general election after opposition parties withdrew their candidacies in a boycott of the election.

Elections in the 2000s

Elections in the 1990s 
Hussain Muhammad Ershad stood from jail for five seats in the June 1996 general election: Rangpur-2, Rangpur-3, Rangpur-5, Rangpur-6, and Kurigram-3. After winning all five, he chose to represent Rangpur-3 and quit the other four, triggering by-elections in them. Anisul Haque Chowdhury of the Awami League was elected in a September 1996 by-election.

Hussain Muhammad Ershad stood from jail for five seats in the 1991 general election: Rangpur-1, Rangpur-2, Rangpur-3, Rangpur-5, and Rangpur-6. After winning all five, he chose to represent Rangpur-3 and quit the other four, triggering by-elections in them. Paritosh Chakrabarti, of the Jatiya Party, was elected in a September 1991 by-election.

References

External links
 

Parliamentary constituencies in Bangladesh
Rangpur District